The list of winners below is generated, primarily, using the Roll of Honour from the Connacht LGFA website. With their win in 2016, Carnacon became the most successful provincial club in Ladies' Football with 15 wins, passing out Ballymacarbry (Waterford) who have 14 Munster titles. Carnacon have now moved to 16 titles.

Kilkerrin-Clonberne are the 2018 champions and will now represent Connacht in the All Ireland series.

This is a work-in-progress and all finals from 1977-2019 will be completed. Only the match details from 1980, 1992 & 1993 are missing.

Key

By year

By Club

colours are of the club as it exists now. Galway Gaels have been attributed their county colours.

By County

References

Ladies' Gaelic football competitions
Ladies